Sparganothoides amitana is a species of moth of the family Tortricidae. It is found in Jalisco, Mexico.

The length of the forewings is about 8.2 mm for males and 8.4 mm for females. The ground colour of the forewings is greyish white mixed with light brownish grey and a scattering of brown-tipped grey scales. The hindwings are greyish white.

Etymology
The species name refers to the close relationship to Sparganothoides machimiana and is derived from Latin amita (meaning paternal aunt).

References

Moths described in 2009
Sparganothoides